Dewabhumi Baluwa is a market place in Panchkhal Municipality in Kabhrepalanchok District in Bagmati Province of central Nepal. It was merged to form the new municipality along with Panchkhal, Deuvumi Baluwa, Anaikot and Sathighar Bhagawati village development committee on 18 May 2014. At the time of the 1991 Nepal census it had a population of 6773 .

References

External links
UN map of the municipalities of Kavrepalanchok District

Populated places in Kavrepalanchok District